Black is beautiful is a cultural movement that was started in the United States in the 1960s by African Americans. It later spread beyond the United States, most prominently in the writings of the Black Consciousness Movement of Steve Biko in South Africa. Black is beautiful got its roots from the Négritude movement of the 1930s. Negritude argued for the importance of a Pan-African racial identity among people of African descent worldwide.

It aims to dispel the racist notion that black people's natural features such as skin color, facial features and hair are inherently ugly. John Rock was long thought to be the first person to coin the phrase "black is beautiful"—during a speech in 1858—but historical records indicate that he never actually used the specific phrase on that day. The movement also encouraged men and women to stop trying to eliminate African-identified traits by attempting to lighten or bleach their skin. Bill Allen, a freelance writer for advertising agencies, claimed he coined the phrase in the 1950s.

The phrase “Black is beautiful” encompass emotional and psychological well-being of black people. It promotes the black culture and identity, where the black past is an inspirational cultural pride. It affirms the beauty of Blacks' natural features, such as their variety of skin colors, hair styles and textures, as well as physical characteristics.   

This movement began in an effort to counteract the racist notion in American culture that features typical of Blacks were less attractive or desirable than those of Whites. Research indicates that the idea of blackness being ugly is highly damaging to the psyche of African Americans, manifesting itself as internalized racism. This idea made its way into black communities themselves and led to practices such as paper bag parties: social events which discriminated against dark-skinned African Americans by only admitting lighter-skinned individuals.

History
While the Black is Beautiful movement started in the 1960s, the fight for equal rights and a positive perception of the African-American body started much earlier in American history. This movement took form because the media and society as a whole had a negative perception of the African-American body as being only suitable for slave status. The Black is Beautiful movement was based around a fight for an equal perception of the black body to help undo all the negative ideas brought about by a history based in white supremacy.

The genesis of the movement was a fashion show titled, Naturally '62 On January 28, 1962 by Kwame Brathwaite. Kwame was a black photographer and activist born in Brooklyn, New York, in 1938. He devoted his life to capturing the lives of others in pictures. In the 1960s, in his small darkroom in Harlem, he developed an imaging technique that made black skin outstand in photographs showing off life and energy. He spent thousands of hours in his darkroom to ensure his images could demonstrate the beauty of black people. His hard work demonstrated his commitment to the black freedom movement. The Grandassa Models at the show deliberately veered away from western concepts of beauty instead incorporating African imagery as a form of protest against "how, in Ebony magazine, you couldn’t find an ebony girl". Naturally '62 proved to be very popular with a crowd forming around the nightclub hosting it, the Purple Manor. It was also subject to controversy. Brathwaite's photos of black musicians, including Stevie Wonder and Bob Marley, would spearhead the movement into the public consciousness. More Naturally shows and adoption of African imagery by musicians such as Nina Simone lead to the looks shown to be normalized.

Proving that Black is Beautiful has bled into fashion, where the idea is that dressing with sophistication in mind allows for one to command automatic respect from those around them. This is exemplified in Black Dandyism, a male fashion movement described in Monica Miller's book Slaves to Fashion. Since enslaved persons were often forbidden from wearing expensive or beautiful fabrics, dressing up the Black body has historically been a radical statement of selfhood and equality. Black Dandyism has morphed over the years, moving from simply dressing sharply in the fashion of the times to what is now the combination of dressing sharply and loud African-inspired prints, and dressing in colors that subvert notions of traditional masculinity.

See also

 African-American culture
 Afro
 Black nationalism
 Black pride
 Cornrows
 Dreadlocks
 Natural hair movement
 Negro É Lindo
 Racial transformation
African-American beauty

References

Further reading
 Blasius, Marc and Shane Phelan, eds. We Are Everywhere: A Historical Sourcebook of Gay and Lesbian Politics. (Routledge, 1997). .

African-American culture
Beauty
Black Power